Dmitri Andreyevich Rusanov (born 25 June 1987) is a former Russian professional football player.

Club career
He played in the Russian Football National League for FC Ural Yekaterinburg in 2009.

External links
 
 

1987 births
Sportspeople from Yekaterinburg
Living people
Russian footballers
Association football forwards
FC Tyumen players
FC Mordovia Saransk players
FC Ural Yekaterinburg players